Al-Sultan Al-Mu’tassimu Billahi Muhibbuddin Tuanku Al-Haj Abdul Halim Mu'adzam Shah ibni Almarhum Sultan Badlishah (28 November 1927 – 11 September 2017) was the 28th Sultan of Kedah, reigning from 1958 to 2017. He served as the fifth Yang di-Pertuan Agong of Malaysia from 1970 to 1975, and as the 14th Yang di-Pertuan Agong from 2011 to 2016. He was the first and only ruler to reign as Yang di-Pertuan Agong twice, as well as the oldest elected to the office. Immediately prior to his death, he was the second longest-reigning living monarch in the world after Queen Elizabeth II of the United Kingdom.

Biography

Early career
Born at Istana Anak Bukit near Alor Setar as Tunku Abdul Halim ibni Tunku Badlishah, he was the second, but eldest surviving son, of Sultan Badlishah (1894–1958; reigned 1943–1958), who later became the 28th Sultan of Kedah. Of Malay and Thai descent, his mother was the Kedah-born princess Tunku Sofiah binti Tunku Mahmud (born 29 April 1899), who died in an automobile accident on 28 February 1934. Abdul Halim's maternal grandfather, Tunku Mahmud, was once Raja Muda (heir presumptive) to the throne of Kedah.

He was educated at Alor Merah and Titi Gajah Malay schools and Sultan Abdul Hamid College in Alor Star between 1946 and 1948. He went on to Wadham College, Oxford and obtained a Diploma in Social Science and Public Administration. He subsequently joined the Kedah Administrative Service, serving in the Alor Star district office and later, the state treasury.

Reign as Sultan of Kedah

On 6 August 1949, Tuanku Abdul Halim was appointed Raja Muda or heir apparent, and acceded as the twenty-eighth Sultan of Kedah on his father's death on 14 July 1958. He was installed at the Balai Besar, Kota Star Palace in Alor Star on 20 February 1959, in a ceremony not held since 1710.

Silver Jubilee Celebrations
Tuanku Abdul Halim celebrated his silver jubilee on 15 August 1983 with his royal consort, Sultanah Bahiyah. To commemorate this occasion the Kedah government opened Jubli Perak Park at Sungai Petani, Kedah's second largest town.

Golden Jubilee celebrations
On 15 July 2008, Tuanku Abdul Halim Muadzam Shah celebrated his Golden Jubilee as the Sultan of Kedah. He was only the fourth sultan in a line of 28 who reigned in Kedah for at least 50 years.

In conjunction with the Golden Jubilee, 15 July 2008 was declared as a public holiday for the state of Kedah. A ceremony of handing over the contributions in conjunction with the Golden Jubilee was held at the Istana Anak Bukit on 6 July 2008 by Kedah Chief Minister Azizan Abdul Razak. Throughout the week of the Golden Jubilee, various events were held to commemorate the Sultan.

Reign as the Yang-di Pertuan Agong of Malaysia

First election as Deputy Yang di-Pertuan Agong
Tuanku Abdul Halim served as Deputy Yang di-Pertuan Agong from 21 September 1965 to 20 September 1970.

First election as Yang di-Pertuan Agong

In July 1970, Tuanku Abdul Halim was elected as the fifth Yang di-Pertuan Agong of Malaysia and served his term in office from 21 September 1970 to 20 September 1975. He was the third youngest monarch to ascend the throne of Yang di-Pertuan Agong after Tuanku Syed Putra of Perlis and Tuanku Mizan Zainal Abidin of Terengganu.

During his kingship, Tuanku Abdul Halim presided over the first transfer of power of the civilian government when his uncle, Prime Minister Tunku Abdul Rahman resigned in favour of his deputy Tun Abdul Razak. Tunku Abdul Rahman had felt that he should not serve under a nephew, given strict Malay royal protocol, but agreed to stay on as prime minister for one day of Tuanku Abdul Halim's reign.

Second election as Deputy Yang di-Pertuan Agong
On 2 November 2006, Tuanku Abdul Halim was elected for the second time to serve a five-year term as Deputy Yang di-Pertuan Agong. He was the first person to have been elected to this office twice.

Second election as Yang di-Pertuan Agong
In October 2011, Abdul Halim was elected to a second term as the Yang di-Pertuan Agong, which commenced on 13 December 2011. He was the first and only regnant sultan to hold the position twice. He was also the oldest Malay Ruler to be installed as Yang di-Pertuan Agong at 84 years and 15 days old, surpassing the previous record holder, Sultan Salahuddin Abdul Aziz of Selangor, who was installed at 73 years and 49 days old. He was installed on 11 April 2012 at Istana Negara.

During his tenure as Yang Di Pertuan Agong, a Council of Regency consisting of his brothers Tunku Annuar (d. May 2014), Tunku Sallehuddin, Tunku Abdul Hamid Thani, and daughter Tunku Puteri Intan Safinaz was assigned to discharge Abdul Halim's duties as Sultan of Kedah. His tenure as Yang Di Pertuan Agong ended on 12 December 2016.

Family life
Tuanku Abdul Halim had two wives:

1. Sultanah Bahiyah, daughter of Tuanku Abdul Rahman of Negeri Sembilan, married 1956. She served as Sultanah of Kedah (1958–2003) and Raja Permaisuri Agong (1970–1975). She died on 26 August 2003 at Istana Kuala Cegar in Alor Star. They had only daughter:
 Her Highness (Yang Teramat Mulia) Brigadier General Tunku Puteri Dato' Seri Diraja Tan Sri Intan Safinaz binti Tuanku AlHaj Abdul Halim Muadzam Shah, The Tunku Temenggong of Kedah (previously Tunku Panglima Besar) (born 22 July 1966). 

They also adopted the twin daughters of his eldest sister, Tunku Hamidah, before the birth of their only child:
 Her Royal Highness (Duli Yang Amat Mulia) Tunku Dato' Seri Diraja Tan Sri Soraya, The Raja Puan Muda of Perak (born 30 April 1960).
 Her Highness (Yang Teramat Mulia) Tunku Sarina (30 April 1960 – 31 August 1991).

Through Tunku Soraya, who married Raja Dato' Seri Diraja Tan Sri Iskandar Zulkarnain, son of Almarhum Sultan Idris Shah II and current Raja Di-Hilir Perak (the second heir apparent of Perak), they gave him three grandsons and two granddaughters:
 His Highness (Yang Teramat Mulia) Raja Nabil Imran Aziz (born 1987)
 His Highness (Yang Teramat Mulia) Raja Idris Shah (born 1989)
 Her Highness (Yang Teramat Mulia) Raja Sarina Intan Bahiyah (born 1992)
 Her Highness (Yang Teramat Mulia) Raja Safia Azizah (born 1997)
 His Highness (Yang Teramat Mulia) Raja Siffudin Muadzam Shah (born 1999)

2. Sultanah Haminah, married in 1975. A commoner from Perak, she was titled Che Puan Kedah until 9 January 2004 when she was installed as Sultanah. She served as Raja Permaisuri Agong during his second term as Yang di-Pertuan Agong.

Issue

Death
Sultan Abdul Halim died on at 2:30 pm 11 September 2017, at the age of 89 (about 3 months shy of his 90th birthday), at Istana Anak Bukit in Alor Setar. He was laid to rest next to grave of his late wife, Sultanah Bahiyah at Langgar Royal Mausoleum in Alor Setar, Kedah on the day after his death.

Ancestry

Military grades
Tuanku Abdul Halim held the rank of Marshal of the Royal Malaysian Air Force in his previous constitutional duties as Commander-in-Chief of the Malaysian Armed Forces as well as the ranks of Field Marshal of the Malaysian Army and Admiral of the Fleet of the Royal Malaysian Navy. Since 1972 he was the Royal Malay Regiment's Colonel-in-Chief, and also performed the same functions for the Malaysian Army's Royal Service Corps.

Awards and recognitions

National and State honours
 :
  Grand Master of the State of Kedah Star of Valour (since 15 July 1958)
  Founding Grand Master and Member of the Royal Family Order of Kedah (since 21 February 1964)
  Founding Grand Master and Member of the Halimi Family Order of Kedah (since January 1973)
  Grand Master of the Kedah Supreme Order of Merit (since 15 July 1958)
  Founding Grand Master of the Supreme Order of Sri Mahawangsa (since 2005)
  Grand Master of the State of Kedah Star of Gallantry (since 15 July 1958)
  Founding Grand Master and Knight Grand Commander (SPMK) of the Exalted Order of the Crown of Kedah (since 21 February 1964)
  Founding Grand Master and Knight Grand Companion (SSDK) of the Order of Loyalty to the Royal House of Kedah (since 21 September 1973)
  Founding Grand Master of the Order of Sultan Abdul Halim Muadzam Shah (since 2008)
  Founding Grand Master and Knight Commander (DHMS) of the Order of Loyalty to Sultan Abdul Halim Muadzam Shah (since 15 July 1983)
  Founding Grand Master of the Glorious Order of the Crown of Kedah (since January 2001)
  (twice as Yang di-Pertuan Agong):
  Recipient of Order of the Royal House of Malaysia (1970 & 2012)
  Member (DMN, 1959) and Grand Master of the Order of the Crown of the Realm (1970–1975 & 2011–2016)
  Grand Master of the Order of the Defender of the Realm (1970–1975 & 2011–2016)
  Grand Master of the Order of Loyalty to the Crown of Malaysia (1970–1975 & 2011–2016)
  Founding Grand Master of the Order of Merit of Malaysia (in 1975 & 2011–2016)
  Grand Master of the Order for Important Services (2011–2016)
  Grand Master of the Order of the Royal Household of Malaysia (1970–1975 & 2011–2016)
 :
  First Class Member of the Royal Family Order of Johor (DK I) (September 1983)
 :
  Recipient of the Royal Family Order of Kelantan (DK) (July 1969)
 :
  Member of the Royal Family Order of Negeri Sembilan (DKNS) (August 1982)
 :
  First Class Member of the Family Order of the Crown of Pahang (DK I) (14 July 1987)
 :
  Member of the Royal Family Order of Perak (DK) (May 1986)
 :
  Member of the Perlis Family Order of the Gallant Prince Syed Putra Jamalullail (DK) (June 1980)
 :
  First Class Member of the Royal Family Order of Selangor (DK I) (1978)
 :
  First Class Member of the Royal Family Order of Terengganu (DK I) (1985)
 :
  Grand Commander of the Premier and Exalted Order of Malacca (DUNM) - Datuk Seri Utama
 :
  Knight Grand Commander of the Order of the Star of Hornbill Sarawak (DP) - Datuk Patinggi (April 1977)

Foreign honours
 :
 Recipient of Royal Family Order of the Crown of Brunei (DKMB, 1 April 2002)
 :
 Collar of the Order of the Chrysanthemum (1970)
 Cordon of the Order of the Rising Sun
 :
 First Class of the Star of Mahaputera (1970)
 :
 Collar of the Order of Pahlavi (1971)
 Commemorative Medal of the 2500th Anniversary of the founding of the Persian Empire (14 October 1971)
 :
 Associated Knight of the Venerable Order of St John (KStJ) (1972)
 Honorary Knight Grand Cross of the Order of the Bath (GCB) (1972)
 :
 Knight of the Most Auspicious Order of the Rajamitrabhorn (1 February 1973)
 Knight of the Most Illustrious Order of the Royal House of Chakri (30 January 2013)
 :
 Collar of the Order of Charles III (1974)
 :
 First Class Recipient of Nishan-e-Pakistan (1974)

Places named after him
Several places were named after him, including:

 Sultan Abdul Halim Highway in Alor Setar, Kedah
 Sultan Abdul Halim Mu'adzam Shah Gallery, a museum in Alor Setar, Kedah
 Sultan Abdul Halim Stadium in Alor Setar, Kedah
 SK Tunku Abdul Halim, a primary school in Alor Setar, Kedah
 Sultan Abdul Halim Ferry Terminal in Penang
 Sultan Abdul Halim Hospital in Sungai Petani, Kedah
 Sultan Abdul Halim Mosque in Sungai Petani, Kedah
 Institut Pendidikan Guru Kampus Sultan Abdul Halim in Sungai Petani, Kedah
 Sekolah Menengah Sultan Abdul Halim, a secondary school in Jitra, Kedah
 Sultan Abdul Halim Muadzam Shah Bridge, also known as the Penang Second Bridge, was named after him on 1 March 2014.
 Sultan Abdul Halim Airport in Kepala Batas, Kedah
 Politeknik Sultan Abdul Halim Mu'adzam Shah (POLIMAS) in Jitra, was also given in honour of his name.
 Jalan Tuanku Abdul Halim in Kuala Lumpur, formerly known as Jalan Duta
 Kompleks Penerangan & Penyiaran Sultan Abdul Halim in Alor Setar, Kedah
 Sultan Abdul Halim Mu'adzam Shah International Islamic University in Kuala Ketil, Kedah
 Kem Sultan Abdul Halim Muadzam Shah (formerly known as Kem Tok Jalai), a military camp in Jitra, Kedah
 Sultan Abdul Halim Mu'adzam Shah Football Cup

Notes and references

External links

 List of Sultans of Kedah

|-

|-

Monarchs of Malaysia
1927 births
2017 deaths
Alumni of Wadham College, Oxford
Marshals of the Royal Malaysian Air Force
Malaysian Muslims
Malaysian people of Malay descent
Malaysian people of Thai descent
Abdul Halim
Abdul Halim

First Classes of Royal Family Order of Selangor
First Classes of the Family Order of Terengganu
First Classes of the Royal Family Order of Johor
Knights Grand Commander of the Order of the Star of Hornbill Sarawak
Recipients of the Darjah Kerabat Diraja Malaysia

Grand Cordons of the Order of the Rising Sun
Honorary Knights Grand Cross of the Order of the Bath
Knights of the Order of St John
Abdul Halim
20th-century Malaysian politicians
21st-century Malaysian politicians
Recipients of the Order of the Crown of the Realm
First Classes of the Family Order of the Crown of Indra of Pahang
Recipients of the Order of Merit of Malaysia